Mónica García de la Fuente (born 10 July 1980) is a Mexican politician and lawyer affiliated with the PVEM. As of 2013 she served as Deputy of the LXII Legislature of the Mexican Congress representing Aguascalientes She was elected by national list.

References

1980 births
Living people
People from Mexico City
Women members of the Chamber of Deputies (Mexico)
21st-century Mexican lawyers
Ecologist Green Party of Mexico politicians
Mexican women lawyers
21st-century Mexican politicians
21st-century Mexican women politicians
Instituto Tecnológico Autónomo de México alumni
Deputies of the LXII Legislature of Mexico
Members of the Chamber of Deputies (Mexico) for Aguascalientes